Lagardère News, formerly known as Lagardère Active, is the media activities arm of the French Lagardère Group.

Its subsidiaries include Lagardère's radio operations, television networks, and book and magazine publishers.

In 2018, Arnaud Lagardère announced that Lagardère would be disposing of its media assets, which they carried out throughout the year. This included their stake in Marie Claire, their radio businesses in Eastern Europe and Africa, and their press titles in France, including Elle.

See also

References

External links
Ketupa.net: Ketupa - Hachette-Filipacchi — extensive profile.

 
French-language television networks
Television networks in France